Børge Fristrup (April 15, 1918 in Copenhagen - March 19, 1985) was a Danish geographer. He studied glaciology, specialising in the Greenland ice sheet, at the University of Copenhagen and at Stockholm University, receiving a Hans Egede Medal for his research in 1971.

Bibliography  
 Børge Fristrup: Indlandsisen (Rhodes Bogforlag, Copenhagen 1963)
 Børge Fristrup: The Greenland Ice Cap (Rhodes, Copenhagen 1966)
 Børge Fristrup: "Climatology and glaciology" (in: Danmarks Natur volume 10: Greenland and the Faroe Islands, Politikens Forlag 1971; ISBN 87-567-1497-1 ; pp. 131-176)
 Børge Fristrup: The Greenland Ice Cap (1986)

References

1918 births
1985 deaths
Danish geographers